Sidney de Souza (born 28 July 1973) is a Brazilian equestrian. He competed in the team eventing at the 1996 Summer Olympics.

References

External links
 

1973 births
Living people
Brazilian male equestrians
Olympic equestrians of Brazil
Equestrians at the 1996 Summer Olympics
People from Cornélio Procópio
Sportspeople from Paraná (state)